Dzierzążnica is a river of Poland, a tributary of the Płonka near Dzierzążnia.

Rivers of Poland
Rivers of Masovian Voivodeship